Peta Gia Wilson (born 18 November 1970) is an Australian actress, lingerie designer and model. She is best known as Nikita in the television series La Femme Nikita.

Biography

Early life
Wilson was born in Sydney on 18 November 1970. She is the daughter of the caterer Karlene White Wilson and Darcy Wilson, a former Warrant Officer in the Australian Army. She spent several years in Papua New Guinea when her father was stationed there. Her parents divorced in 1982.

Career
Wilson worked first as a model in Australia and in Europe before moving to Los Angeles in 1991. There she studied acting with Arthur Mendoza at the Actors Circle Theatre, and with Tom Waits at the TomKat Repertory Group. After five years of study, she was hired for some small roles in independent films such as Naked Jane and Loser. 

In 1996, she was preparing to continue her studies at an acting school in New York City, but decided to audition first for a new television show being produced for the USA cable TV channel in North America. Over 200 actresses auditioned for the starring role, and Wilson was chosen. The show was called La Femme Nikita, based on the French action thriller movie La Femme Nikita (1990). 

The hour-long series was produced by a combination of Canadian and American companies. It ran for five years and 96 episodes (22 episodes per season for four years, and another eight episodes in its fifth and final TV year). Most were filmed in and around Toronto, Ontario. Wilson's co-stars were Roy Dupuis, Don Francks, Alberta Watson and Eugene Robert Glazer. Wilson was twice nominated for the annual Gemini Award for "Best Performance by An Actress in a Continuing Leading Dramatic Role".

In 2001, Wilson took part in the Moscow International Film Festival, where she met Russian president Vladimir Putin, who confessed to being a fan of hers. She portrayed real-life actress Anny Ondra in the television movie Joe and Max (2002).

She also appeared as the vampire Mina Harker in the 2003 film The League of Extraordinary Gentlemen. 

During 2006, she appeared on an Australian TV mystery anthology drama Two Twisted. and had a small role in the movie Superman Returns as the character Bobbie-Faye, a NASA spokeswoman.

In 2009, Wilson starred in an Australian independent film Beautiful. She guest starred on CSI: Miami (2010) and The Finder (2012).

In 2012, she launched a lingerie label, Wylie Wilson, with a flagship store in Los Angeles.

In 2013, Wilson received the Best Actress Award at the Cinerockom International Film Festival for her performance as CIA agent Marla Criswell in the short film Liberator.

Personal life
Wilson lived with her longtime boyfriend, director Damian Harris, from 1997 until their separation in 2002. They have a son named Marlowe.

Filmography

Awards and nominations

References

Further reading
 Heyn, Christopher. "A Conversation with Peta Wilson". Inside Section One: Creating and Producing TV's La Femme Nikita. Introduction by Peta Wilson. Los Angeles: Persistence of Vision Press, 2006. pp. 66–74. . In-depth conversation with Peta Wilson about her role as Nikita on La Femme Nikita, as well as her approach to acting.
 Connolley, Dawn. "Nuthin' Fancy Luv, I'm Australian". La Femme Peta: The Unauthorized Biography of Peta Wilson. Toronto, ECW Press, 2000. pp. 1–32. . Unauthorized biography of Peta Wilson culled from various pre-published sources.
 Edwards, Ted. La Femme Nikita X-Posed: The Unauthorized Biography of Peta Wilson and Her On-Screen Character. Prima Lifestyles, 1998, .

External links

 

1970 births
Australian film actresses
Australian television actresses
Living people
Actresses from Sydney
20th-century Australian actresses
21st-century Australian actresses